Dame Alexandra Vivien Burslem  (née Thornley; born 6 May 1940), also known as Sandra Burslem, is a British academic and educationalist.

Biography
Born in Shanghai, China, Dame Alexandra was the daughter of Stanley Morris Thornley, the British Ambassador to China. Sandra Thornley returned to England during the expulsion of the foreign nationals that occurred during the Communist Revolution. She afterwards attended the Arnold High School for Girls in Blackpool and was married in the year 1960. At the age of 28, she enrolled on her first degree course while she was a single mother at the University of Manchester (as a mature student) and took a first-class BA degree in Politics and Modern History. Following this, she became a lecturer at Manchester Polytechnic and rose gradually to be Deputy Vice-Chancellor and Academic Director by 1992. 

Her academic career culminated in September 1997, when she was named as Vice-Chancellor of Manchester Metropolitan University, where she remained until 2005.

Honours
Burslem was appointed Dame Commander of the Order of the British Empire (DBE) in the 2004 New Year Honours. She served as High Sheriff of Greater Manchester for 2006–2007 and remains a Deputy Lieutenant of the county.

A building at the university's All Saints campus has been named the Sandra Burslem Building.

List of posts held
Dame Alexandra Burslem has held a number of public and academic posts:
 At Manchester Metropolitan University (formerly Manchester Polytechnic):
 Lecturer in politics and public administration (1973–82)
 Head, Department of applied community studies (1982–86)
 Dean, Faculty of community studies, law and education (1986–88)
 Assistant Director (academic) (1988–90)
 Deputy Director (1990–92)
 Deputy Vice-Chancellor and Academic Director (1992–97)
 Justice of the Peace, Manchester Inner City Bench (1981–2010)
 Vice-chair, Learning and Skills Council (2004–?)
 Chairman, BBC North Regional Advisory Council
 Member, BBC General Advisory Council
 Deputy Chair, Higher Education Staff Development Agency (HESDA)

Personal life
Her first marriage to James Lowe lasted from 1960 until 1971, from which she had two children, Eliot Lowe and Matthew Lowe. She married Dr Richard Waywell Burslem in 1977 and gave birth to her third child, Victoria. She was born in Shanghai and spent some of her early years in an internment camp there. She documents this experience in her book.

References

Further reading
Operation of the Honours System: oral and written evidence, Thursday 23 April 2009 : Dame Alexandra Burslem, chair of the Education Honours Committee, Sir John Parker, chair of the Economy Honours Committee, Dame Steve Shirley, member of the Economy Honours Committee and Denis Brennan, head of the Honours and Appointments Secretariat, Cabinet Office / Public Administration Select Committee. London: Stationery Office, 2009 

 

1940 births
High Sheriffs of Greater Manchester
Alumni of Manchester Metropolitan University
Alumni of the Victoria University of Manchester
Academics of Manchester Metropolitan University
British educational theorists
Dames Commander of the Order of the British Empire
Living people
Educators from Shanghai
Deputy Lieutenants of Greater Manchester
English justices of the peace
British expatriates in China